The 1969–70 season was Swindon Town's first season in the Division Two after promotion from Division Three in 1969. In what proved to be a historic season for Swindon as the club added to its first major piece of silverware, the League Cup by winning the Anglo-Italian Cup and Anglo-Italian Cup Winners' Cup.

Second Division

Matchday results and line-ups

Division Three line-ups 

1 1st Substitution

F.A. Cup line-ups 

1 1st Substitution.

League Cup line-ups 

1 1st Substitution.

Anglo-Italian Cup Winners' Cup 

1 1st Substitution

Anglo-Italian Cup 

1 1st Substitution and 2nd Substitution.

Appearances

Last updated 18 August 2014

|-
|}

Notes

References 

1969-70
English football clubs 1969–70 season